Only ten of the nineteen Virginia incumbents were re-elected.

References

See also 
 List of United States representatives from Virginia
 United States House of Representatives elections, 1800 and 1801

1801
Virginia
United States House of Representatives